Julee Cerda (born January 29, 1978) is a South Korean born American actress who resides in New York.

Biography
Born in South Korea to a Korean mother and Dominican father, Julee Cerda was raised simultaneously in New York and the Dominican Republic. While in high school, her class took a field trip to see the Broadway production of Les Misérables where Cerda stated she was "floored" by the production. This show convinced her to take a career in acting. She later attended Marist College and participated in comedy troupes such as Upright Citizens Brigade and Tangana!, the latter of which she was a founding member. She moved on to acting in advertisements, but wished to move on to other wider acting roles stating, "There will always be a reason not to do something. I had a lot of student loan debt for a career in advertising. There were a lot of lows getting to the point where I am today. There are still lows that I deal with. But not listening to your true self will beat you up, and you can either bury it or let it thrive." Cerda has been among actors and actresses of mixed ethnicity who have found it difficult working in the Hollywood system. "I don't fit 100% into any category. I'm an American, but casting directors don't always see me as that. I'm often looked at as the 'other', but it's getting better because people of color are working to make it better."

Cerda began booking roles in high-profile television productions such as Homeland, Orange Is the New Black, House of Cards and Nurse Jackie. She also gained recognition for starring in the Broadway revival of Children of a Lesser God and Smart People. She also has a role in the second season of Marvel's Iron Fist, which is set in the Marvel Cinematic Universe. Cerda was cast in the Disney+ series, The Mighty Ducks: Game Changers, which premiered on March 26, 2021.

Personal life
Cerda is married and has one child. She also runs a fashion blog on the side called Attached to the Hip.

Filmography

Film

Television

References

External links

Living people
1978 births
21st-century American actresses
American film actresses
American television actresses
Actresses from Seoul
American actresses of Korean descent
American people of Dominican Republic descent
Marist College alumni